Agalychnis is a genus of tree frogs native to forests in Mexico, Central America and northwestern South America.

Taxonomy 
The following species are recognised in the genus Agalychnis:

External links

References

 
Phyllomedusinae
Amphibian genera
Taxa named by Edward Drinker Cope